Ruby Vroom is the debut studio album by American rock band Soul Coughing, released in 1994. The album's sound is a mixture of sample-based tunes (loops of Raymond Scott's "Powerhouse" on "Bus to Beelzebub", Toots and the Maytals, Howlin' Wolf, The Andrews Sisters, and The Roches on "Down to This", and a loop of sampler player Mark Degli Antoni's orchestral horns on "Screenwriter's Blues", among others). It also features guitar-based tunes like "Janine", "Moon Sammy", and "Supra Genius" and jazzy, upright-bass-fueled songs that often slyly quoted other material—the theme from Courageous Cat on "Is Chicago, Is Not Chicago", Thelonious Monk's "Misterioso" on "Casiotone Nation", and Bobby McFerrin's cover of Joan Armatrading's "Opportunity" on "Uh, Zoom Zip".

The album sold approximately 70,000 copies, as of April 1996, according to Billboard.

Title 
Ruby was named after a mispronunciation of the name of Ruby Froom, daughter of record producer Mitchell Froom—a frequent collaborator of Ruby Vroom producer Tchad Blake—and singer/songwriter Suzanne Vega.

Recording 
The album was recorded at Sunset Sound Factory in Hollywood, Blake and Froom's usual haunt—a storage room near the studio's lounge was filled with vintage keyboards and road cases filled with toys—whistles, baby rattles, children's toy xylophones. Many of these ended up in the songs, such as a train whistle played by Doughty on "Uh, Zoom Zip". This was in keeping with Tchad Blake's spirit of maverick experimentation, which included sticking a binaural head-shaped microphone in front of Yuval Gabay's drumkit, sticking a mic in a car muffler, called "the Bone" and sticking that in the drum booth as well, and having Doughty improvise wild, yelling ad-libs on "Casiotone Nation", singing into a cheap amplification system called an Ahuja that Blake bought in India. The speaker was essentially a huge bullhorn atop a stick.

The album's lone guest is Rachel Benbow Murdy, band founder Mike Doughty's ex-girlfriend, who supplies a vocal on "Janine". Doughty had Murdy go out to a payphone in Sheridan Square in New York and sing a rendition of "Lemon Tree" with an improvised melody into their answering machine. Recorded a year before the Ruby sessions, Doughty and bass player Sebastian Steinberg recorded the tune at the avant-garde jazz club The Knitting Factory during the daytime, when the club was closed, with club soundperson James McLean. McLean put a mic on the answering machine, which Doughty had brought to the session.

Track listing
"Is Chicago, Is Not Chicago" – 3:48
"Sugar Free Jazz" – 3:55
"Casiotone Nation" – 3:50
"Blueeyed Devil" – 4:12
"Bus to Beelzebub" – 4:33
"True Dreams of Wichita" – 5:00
"Screenwriter's Blues" – 5:08
"Moon Sammy" – 4:09
"Supra Genius" – 3:59
"City of Motors" – 4:38
"Uh, Zoom Zip" – 3:56
"Down to This" – 3:49
"Mr. Bitterness" – 5:32
"Janine" – 4:58

Personnel
Mike Doughty (billed as "M. Doughty") – vocals, guitar
Sebastian Steinberg – bass guitar, upright bass, backing vocals, sampler
Mark de Gli Antoni – keyboards, programming
Yuval Gabay – drums, programming

References

1994 debut albums
Soul Coughing albums
Albums produced by Tchad Blake
Slash Records albums